The 1947 National League Division One was the 13th season of speedway in the United Kingdom and the second post-war season of the highest tier of motorcycle speedway in Great Britain.

Summary
Harringay Racers rejoined the league. Wembley Lions retained the title. Belle Vue retained the National Trophy.

Final Table Division One

On account of the small number of teams in the league the British Speedway Cup was run in a league format. Wembley Lions won all their matches home and away to complete a double.

British Speedway Cup table

Top Ten Riders (League only)

National Trophy
The 1947 National Trophy was the tenth edition of the Knockout Cup. 

During the National Trophy quarter final match between Wembley and Harringay (on 15 August) the 27-year-old Wembley rider Nelson 'Bronco' Wilson received fatal injuries in the fourth heat. He died in the Prince of Wales Hospital, Tottenham, the following day from a fractured skull. Remarkably another rider Cyril Anderson of the Norwich Stars was killed instantly on the same evening, during the Division Two Best Pairs.

Qualifying
Middlesbrough and Norwich qualified for the quarter finals by virtue of finishing 1st & 2nd in the Second Division Cup.

Quarterfinals

Semifinals

Final

First leg

Second leg

Belle Vue were National Trophy Champions, winning on aggregate 116–100.

See also
 List of United Kingdom Speedway League Champions
 Knockout Cup (speedway)

References

Speedway National League
1947 in speedway
1947 in British motorsport